Afghanistan national bandy team has been set up by bandy playing Afghan ex-pats in Karlstad, Sweden, taking up a sport which is very popular in Sweden.

The team is not sanctioned by the sports governing bodies in Afghanistan, even if the Federation of International Bandy has accepted Afghanistan as a member, so it is not allowed to take part in the World Championship. However, it has played friendlies against the Somalia national bandy team (which also is based in Sweden) in 2016 and 2017.

Sources

National bandy teams
Bandy
Bandy in Afghanistan